Daniel's Gotta Die is a 2022 Canadian comedy thriller film directed by Jeremy LaLonde, from a screenplay by Matthew Dressel. The film stars Joel David Moore, Jason Jones, Mary Lynn Rajskub, Carly Chaikin, Chantel Riley, Iggy Pop, and Bob Saget. It is Saget's final film before his death.

Premise
Daniel Powell's plan to reconnect with his siblings hits a snag when he discovers they all want to kill him for his inheritance. As the brothers and sisters are forced to spend the weekend together at the family beach house on the Cayman Islands, one thing becomes painfully clear: Daniel's going to find out what family means, even if it kills him.

Cast
 Joel David Moore as Daniel Powell
 Jason Jones as Victor Powell
 Mary Lynn Rajskub as Mia Powell
 Carly Chaikin as Jessica Powell
 Chantel Riley as Emily Montgomery, Daniel's fiancée
 Iggy Pop as Edward Powell
 Bob Saget as Lawrence, Edward's lawyer
 Varun Saranga as Carter
 Dax Ravina as Pierce

Production
The screenplay was originally titled Killing Daniel and written by Dressel in 2011. It was originally slated to enter production in 2015, with Bill Duke directing a primarily African-American cast, but was not completed at that time.

After LaLonde signed on as director, the film re-entered production in 2021, under the title Blue Iguana. Principal photography began on the island of Grand Cayman on March 8, 2021 and concluded on April 2, 2021.

Release
Daniel's Gotta Die premiered at the Austin Film Festival on October 28, 2022.

References

External links
 

2022 comedy films
2022 independent films
2022 thriller films
2020s Canadian films
2020s comedy thriller films
2020s English-language films
Canadian comedy thriller films
Canadian independent films
English-language Canadian films
Films about dysfunctional families
Films directed by Jeremy Lalonde
Films set in the Cayman Islands
Films shot in the Cayman Islands